Mikhail Kukushkin was the defending champion, but chose not to defend his title.

Evgeny Donskoy won the title defeating fellow Russian Konstantin Kravchuk in the final, 6–3, 6–3.

Seeds

Draw

Finals

Top half

Bottom half

References
 Main Draw
 Qualifying Draw

President's Cup (tennis) - Singles
2016 Men's Singles